Giuseppe Azzini (26 March 1891 – 11 November 1925) was an Italian racing cyclist. He won two stages of the 1913 Giro d'Italia and finished third overall.

References

External links
 

1891 births
1925 deaths
Italian male cyclists
Italian Giro d'Italia stage winners
Cyclists from the Province of Mantua
People from Gazzuolo